Xanthophyllum contractum is a tree in the family Polygalaceae. The specific epithet  is from the Latin meaning "contracted", referring to short inflorescences and short fruit stalks.

Description
The twigs are smooth and pale yellowish.

Distribution and habitat
Xanthophyllum contractum is endemic to Borneo. Its habitat is lowland riparian forests.

References

contractum
Endemic flora of Borneo
Trees of Borneo
Plants described in 1982